Fruitbats & Crows is the follow-up to Farryl Purkiss's 2006 self-titled album. In the three years between albums, Purkiss had toured Australia three times, Europe, United States and South Africa. His songs have been used in campaigns by Nissan (Greece), Audi (UK), MTN (South Africa) as well as placement in the film "Adopted" (featuring Pauly Shore). In 2007 he was voted the most popular musician by Heat Magazine (South Africa)

This album was produced by Brian O'Shea. The album contains 12 new tracks and features international guest musicians such as Ash Grunwald (Australia) and John Ellis (Tree 63).

The album was mixed and engineered by Brent Quinton (except for "Man of Alibi", engineered by Earl Large and co-engineered by Brent Quinton). The album was mastered by Rogan Kelsey.

Track listing

Singles
The first single produced from the album was "A Million Grains of Sand".  The music video peaked at No. 4 on South African music channel, MK.

Musicians

 Farryl Purkiss – vocals, acoustic guitar
 Kieran Smith – bass guitar
 Brent Quinton – bass guitar, electric guitar
 Gareth Gale – drums
 Ross Campbell – drums
 Ash Grunwald – slide guitar ("Man of Alibi")
 John Ellis – electric guitar ("Kissing Devils on the Cheek", "A Million Grains of Sand", "Creeping Up on Me", "Let It Be")
 Candice Nel – backing vocals ("Kissing Devils on the Cheek", "Monkeys' Wedding")
 Damon Forbes – backing vocals ("Kissing Devils on the Cheek")
 Burton Naidoo – keyboards
 Guy Buttery – acoustic guitar ("Monkeys' Wedding", "No One Left To Blame")
 Sanjeet Teeluck – Harmonium ("Bleed")

Reception

Release history

References

2009 albums
Farryl Purkiss albums